The Brdo-Brijuni Process is an annual multilateral event in the Western Balkans. It was initiated in 2013 by Slovenian president Borut Pahor and Croatian president Ivo Josipović. The first official meeting was in Brdo pri Kranju, Slovenia. The main focus of the Process is the enlargement of the European Union with countries of the Western Balkans. Similar meetings were held at the prime-ministerial level in 2010 and 2011 by then-Prime Ministers of Slovenia and Croatia, Borut Pahor and Jadranka Kosor. The Brdo-Brijuni process includes Slovenia and Croatia (EU member states) and candidates and potential candidates for EU membership from the Western Balkans (Serbia, Montenegro, Albania, North Macedonia, Bosnia and Herzegovina and Kosovo).

In 2014, the Berlin Process was initiated by then-Chancellor of Germany Angela Merkel, in which all of the Brdo-Brijuni Process countries are included as well.

Current representatives

Meetings

Meetings by host country

References

External links

21st-century diplomatic conferences
Southeastern Europe
Contemplated enlargements of the European Union
Foreign relations of Slovenia
Government of Slovenia
Politics of Slovenia
Foreign relations of Croatia